Karien is an Afrikaans and Dutch feminine given name.  Notable people known by this name include the following:

Karien Robbers (born 1993), Dutch rower
Karien van Gennip, nickname of Catharina Elisabeth Godefrida van Gennip (born 1968), Dutch politician

See also

Kamień (disambiguation)
Karen (name)
Karie (name)
Kariel
Karin (given name)
Karine
Karmen (name)
Karren (name)
Kareen (disambiguation)

Notes

Dutch feminine given names